was a Japanese psychiatrist, cultural critic, and one-time deputy director for Japan's Ministry of Health, Labour and Welfare (厚生省 Kōseishō).

Miyamoto graduated from Nihon University Medical College (日本大学医学部 Nihon Daigaku Igakubu) in Tokyo in 1973 :ja:宮本政於. He subsequently spent a year in post-graduate training for pathology before moving to the United States where he spent three years studying psychiatry and psychoanalysis at Yale University.  Upon completion, he took the position of assistant professor at Cornell University in 1980. In 1984, he accepted a position as assistant professor at New York Medical College.  In 1986, he joined the Ministry of Health, Labour and Welfare as deputy director of the Mental Health Division.

In 1992, he began writing a series of articles critical of Japan's bureaucratic culture for the monthly magazine Gekkan Asahi.  These were later published in the best-selling book  or "Code of the Bureaucrats", which was later published in English under the title Straitjacket Society.  Following the publication of his articles, he experienced a series of demotions and was finally fired by the Ministry in February 1995. After being fired, he published a second book in 1997 titled  or Psychoanalyzing the Bureaucrats . This second book has not yet been translated into English.

He spent the remainder of his life giving lectures on Japanese society and the Japanese bureaucracy. Dr. Miyamoto died in Paris from colorectal cancer on July 18, 1999

References 
 Japan Policy Research Institute. Group-Think Meets Individualism: The Saga of Dr. Masao Miyamoto and the Japanese Bureaucracy. in JPRI Critique. Dec 1995.
 :ja:宮本政於
 https://www.amazon.com/Straitjacket-Society-Insiders-Irreverent-Bureaucratic/dp/4770018487
 https://www.amazon.co.jp/お役所の精神分析-宮本-政於/dp/4062086387
 https://www.amazon.co.jp/お役所の掟―ぶっとび霞が関事情-講談社プラスアルファ文庫-宮本-政於/dp/4062562057/

Nihon University alumni
Cornell University faculty
Japanese psychiatrists
Japanese expatriates in France
Deaths from cancer in France
Deaths from colorectal cancer
1948 births
1999 deaths
20th-century Japanese physicians